Virgil Lozano (born Virgilio Arturo Lozano Soto; December 8, 1979) is a Mexican mixed martial artist and a Pankration Athlema World Championship medalist.

Lozano was the last Middleweight Champion of the Cage of Fire and Baja Cage Fighting MMA Promotions and a former member of Ken Shamrock's Lions Den fighting team during the late 1990s, early 2000s.

Mixed martial arts
In 1998 Virgil Lozano joined the now legendary Lions Den Academy, founded by UFC Hall of Famer Ken Shamrock.

In 1999 Lozano became part of the Lions Den professional MMA fighting team, which included notable fighters like Guy Mezger, Vernon White, Tra Telligman, Mikey Burnett, Pete Williams and Jerry Bohlander.

Professional MMA Debut

Lozano made his professional debut, as part of the Lions Den team, on August 10, 2001 against Yasuki Miyake from Japan. After 3 rounds the fight was declared a draw.

Originally Lozano was scheduled to fight Phil Baroni but the match was changed after another fighter was pulled out of the event due to an injury.

The fight was part of the event World Mixed Martial Arts Association 1: MegaFights, which featured Ken Shamrock vs Sam Adkins as the main event.

Pankration Athlema World Championships
Lozano participated in the Pankration Athlima World Championships in Athens, Greece. He won a bronze medal in 2000 and a silver medal in 2002.

MMA Fighting Challenge
In 2005, Lozano fought twice in the MMA Fighting Challenge in Guadalajara, Jalisco, México, winning both fights; one by Submission and the other one by TKO (Doctor's stoppage).

Cage of Fire
Lozano continued his professional MMA career in México for the Cage of Fire MMA Promotion. He fought as a Middleweight from 2006 to 2008. In 2007 he became the Middleweight Champion and retained the belt until the promotion was terminated in 2008.

Bellator Fighting Championships

In 2009 Lozano was invited to participate in the Bellator Fighting Championships.

On April 15, 2009 Lozano fought Hector Lombard in the first round of the Middleweight Tournament at the Lloyd Noble Center in  Norman, Oklahoma, U.S.

The fight was won by Hector Lombard via KO in the first round. Lombard went on to win the tournament and reign undefeated as the MW champion until he was signed by the UFC.

The fight aired nationally in the U.S. via tape-delay the following night on Saturday, April 18, 2009 through an exclusive television agreement with ESPN.

Baja Cage Fighting
In 2010 Lozano fought in the new Baja Cage Fights MMA Promotion. On July 17, 2010 he fought against Greg Raedel for the BCF Middleweight Championship. He won the fight on the first round via Kneebar Submission.

Mixed martial arts record

|-
|Win
|align=center|7-2-1
| Greg Raedel
|Submission (kneebar)
|BCF 1 - Return of the Champ 
|
|align=center|1
|align=center|3:39
|Tijuana, Baja California, Mexico
|
|-
|Loss
|align=center|6-2-1
| Hector Lombard
|KO (punch) 
|Bellator 3
|
|align=center|1
|align=center|1:10
|Norman, Oklahoma, United States
|
|-
|Win
|align=center|6-1-1
| Marcos Rodriguez
|Submission (armbar)
|COF 12 - Nightmare 
|
|align=center|4
|align=center|2:55
|Tijuana, Baja California, Mexico
|
|-
|Win
|align=center|5-1-1
| Ulysses Cortez
|Submission (armbar)
|COF 10 - November Pain 
|
|align=center|1
|align=center|4:02
|Tijuana, Baja California, Mexico
|
|-
|Win
|align=center|4-1-1
| Bill Smallwood
|Submission (injury)
|COF 7 - Face Off 
|
|align=center|2
|align=center|2:16
|Tijuana, Baja California, Mexico
|
|-
|Loss
|align=center|3-1-1
| Ulysses Cortez
|KO (punch)
|COF 5 - Cage of Fire 5 
|
|align=center|1
|align=center|0:14
|Tijuana, Baja California, Mexico
|
|-
|Win
|align=center|3-0-1
| Nicolas Hart
|Submission (armbar)
|COF 3 - Cage of Fire 3 
|
|align=center|1
|align=center|N/A
|Tijuana, Baja California, Mexico
|
|-
|Win
|align=center|2-0-1
| Arturo Contreras
|TKO (doctor stoppage)
|MMAFC 4 - MMA Fighting Challenge 4 
|
|align=center|2
|align=center|2:58
|Guadalajara, Jalisco, Mexico
|
|-
|Win
|align=center|1-0-1
| Miguel Huante
|Submission (strikes)
|MMAFC 3 - MMA Fighting Challenge 3 
|
|align=center|1
|align=center|1:30
|Guadalajara, Jalisco, Mexico
|
|-
| Draw
|align=center|0-0-1
| Yasuki Miyake
|Draw
|WMMAA 1: MegaFights 
|
|align=center|3
|align=center|5:00
|Atlantic City, New Jersey, United States
|
|-

References

External links
 

1979 births
Living people
Mexican male mixed martial artists
Mixed martial artists utilizing pankration